Dorcadion holosericeum is a species of beetle in the family Cerambycidae. It was described by Krynicky in 1832. It is known from Poland, Russia, Belarus, Moldova, Romania, Slovakia, Georgia, and Ukraine.

Subspecies
 Dorcadion holosericeum holosericeum Krynicki, 1832
 Dorcadion holosericeum tristriatum Suvorov, 1913

References

holosericeum
Beetles described in 1832